The Riverside County Library System (RCLS), located in Riverside County, California, United States, is a public library system composed of 35 libraries, two museums and two mobile resource vans. The RCLS is a member of the Inland Library Network. It is the first library system in the nation that turned over its entire operation to a private company.

Management
Prior to July 1997, the Riverside County public libraries were managed by the city of Riverside, California. When property tax money was diverted from libraries to schools in the early 1990s, the library system began to experience cut in hours, dwindling collections, and staff lay-offs. In July 1997, the County hired Library Systems and Services, Inc., located in Germantown, Maryland to operate its sprawling public library system. All library employees, except for the county librarian, janitorial service, and landscape maintenance, work for the private company.  LS&S divided the library system into three districts, increased hours within each district and added staff. For its success, the RCLS Management Outsourcing Program became the 1998 National Council for Public-Private Partnerships Project Award Winner.

Services
 RCLS operates several in-demand literacy services including Adult Literacy, English as a Second Language, and Digital Literacy.
 An extensive digital resources catalogue including career building tools, homework help and e-resources. 
 All library locations offer printing services to community members
 All library locations offer free Wi-Fi and computer access. Wi-Fi hotspots and Chromebooks are also available for loan from all branches including the mobile resource vans. 
 Project Connect Now supports social work programs for the at-risk and homeless population of Riverside, including the "Lawyers in the Library" program which brings free legal aid to those in need.
 Through grant funding from the California State Library and partnerships with local school districts, "Lunch at the Library" provides a free lunch for all those under 18 during the summer. 
 With funding from the California State Library and California State Parks, library card holders can now check out a park pass to bring their family to any of the hundreds of state parks throughout California
 The Riverside County Library System is co-recipient of the Raul and Estella Mora Award for its annual promotion of Día de los Niños/Día de los Libros.
 The program earned the library a John Cotton Dana Award in 2005. for the outreach program Leer Es Triunfar (Reading Is Succeeding), an outreach program for the system's Spanish language readers. 
 The Riverside County Library was chosen by the Association for Library Services to Children as the site of the 2010 Arbuthnot Lecture, featuring Kathleen T. Horning.

Retrospective
In November 2007, RCLS sponsored a retrospective exhibit of photographs portraying 125 years of Riverside County library history, "The Libraries of Riverside County: A Millennium of Service" in the lobby of the UC Riverside Science Library as well as traveling over 250 miles throughout the county. The exhibit was viewed by over 275,000 people during its year long exhibition. It commemorated public, private, academic, medical and tribal libraries in Riverside County. In 2022, the System celebrates 25 years since the merger with LS&S.

Members

Library Connect Mobile Resource Vans
 Desert Resource Van
 Western Resource Van

Libraries
 Anza Valley Community Library
Cabazon Library
 Calimesa Library
 Canyon Lake Branch Library
 Cathedral City Branch Library
 Coachella Branch Library
 Desert Hot Springs Library
 Eastvale Library
 El Cerrito Library
 French Valley Library
 Glen Avon Branch Library
 Grace Mellman Community Library
 Highgrove Branch Library
 Home Gardens Library
 Idyllwild Branch Library
 Indio Library
 La Quinta Library
 Lake Elsinore Library
 Lake Tamarisk Library
 Lakeside Branch Library
 Louis Robidoux Branch Library
 Mead Valley Library
 Mecca Library
 Menifee Library
 Norco Branch Library
 Nuview Branch Library
 Palm Desert Public Library
 Perris Library
 San Jacinto Branch Library
 Sun City Branch Library
 Ronald H. Roberts Temecula Public Library
 Thousand Palms Library
 Valle Vista Library
 Wildomar Library
 Woodcrest Community Library

Museums 
 Edward Dean Museum
 La Quinta Museum

References

 Statistics, 2005

External links
 Riverside County Library System Website

Riverside
Libraries in Riverside County, California
Education in Riverside County, California